Tau Eridani (τ Eridani, τ Eri) is a group of fairly widely scattered stars in the constellation Eridanus.

They form an exception to the general rule that stars that share the same Bayer designation are close together: τ1 is nearly 20° away from τ9 (Pi Orionis is another example of this).

 τ1 Eridani (1 Eridani)
 τ2 Eridani (2 Eridani)
 τ3 Eridani (11 Eridani)
 τ4 Eridani (16 Eridani)
 τ5 Eridani (19 Eridani)
 τ6 Eridani (27 Eridani)
 τ7 Eridani (28 Eridani)
 τ8 Eridani (33 Eridani)
 τ9 Eridani (36 Eridani)

All of them were member of asterism 天苑 (Tiān Yuàn), Celestial Meadows, Hairy Head mansion.

See also 
Map analysis of the 1961 Zeta Reticuli Incident

References

Eridanus (constellation)
Eridani, Tau